The 2014 K3 Challengers League, known as the Daum K3 Challengers League 2014, was the eighth season of amateur K3 League. The top three clubs of each group qualified for the championship playoffs after the home and away season of two groups (16 matches per team) and the interleague play (9 matches per team). The first and second-placed team in the overall table advanced to final and semi-final respectively, and the other four clubs advanced to the first round. Asan United withdrew from the league, but FC Uijeongbu joined the league.

Teams

Regular season

Group A

Group B

Overall table

Championship playoffs

Bracket

First round

Second round

Semi-final

Final

See also
 2014 in South Korean football
 2014 Korean FA Cup

References

External links

K3 League (2007–2019) seasons
2014 in South Korean football